Sabancaya is an active  stratovolcano in the Andes of southern Peru, about  northwest of Arequipa. It is considered part of the Central Volcanic Zone of the Andes, one of the three distinct volcanic belts of the Andes. The Central Volcanic Zone includes a number of volcanoes, some of which like Huaynaputina have had large eruptions and others such as Sabancaya and Ubinas have been active in historical time. Sabancaya forms a volcanic complex together with Hualca Hualca to the north and Ampato to the south and has erupted andesite and dacite. It is covered by a small ice cap which leads to a risk of lahars during eruptions.

Sabancaya has generated numerous long lava flows especially during the early Holocene, while activity in the later Holocene has been more explosive. Historical reports indicate eruptions during the 18th century. The volcano returned to activity in 1986, culminating in a large eruption in 1990. Since then it has been continuously active with the emission of ash and gas.

Name 

The name "Sabancaya" is Quechua and means tongue of fire or spitting volcano, likely a reference to the eruptive activity. The name is attested from 1595, implying that volcanic activity was observed since that date.

Geography and geomorphology 

The Rio Colca valley is located north of the Sabancaya-Hualca Hualca-Ampato volcano complex. The principal economic activities in the area are agriculture, animal husbandry, mining and tourism.

Regional 

The subduction of the Nazca Plate beneath the South American Plate in the Peru-Chile Trench leads to volcanic activity in the Andes. This volcanic activity presently occurs in three segments, the Northern Volcanic Zone, the Central Volcanic Zone and the Southern Volcanic Zone. There is an additional volcanic belt south of the Southern Volcanic Zone, the Austral Volcanic Zone. Sabancaya is located in the Central Volcanic Zone of the Andes, which extends through southern Peru. Many volcanoes in the Central Volcanic Zone are poorly known, owing to their remote locations and adverse conditions such as high altitude.

Of these volcanoes, Sabancaya, El Misti, Ubinas, Huaynaputina, Ticsani and Tutupaca have been active during historical time. Further volcanoes in the area with Pliocene-Quaternary activity are Sara Sara, Solimana, Coropuna, Ampato, Chachani, Yucamane, Casiri and Tacora.

These volcanoes are found in places where strike-slip faults which delimit the volcanic arc and strike along its length intersect additional faults formed by extensional tectonics. Such faults, mainly normal faults, occur around Sabancaya as well and include the Huambo-Cabanaconde, the Huanca, the Ichupampa, the Pampa Sepina, Sepina, Solarpampa and Trigal faults; the volcanoes Ampato and Sabancaya are aligned on this fault, which may thus be responsible for their existence. These fault systems are still active and experience occasional earthquakes and deformation, and their activity appears to be in part triggered by underground magma movements at Sabancaya.

Local 

It forms a group of volcanoes with the northern Hualca Hualca and the southern Ampato in the Cordillera Occidental, which tower above the Colca Canyon in the north and the Siguas Valley in the southwest. There is evidence of age progression from the oldest, Hualca Hualca, over Ampato, to the youngest volcano, Sabancaya.

Sabancaya consists of two separate centres that are formed by neighbouring domes, Sabancaya I North and Sabancaya II South. The summit crater of the volcano lies between these two domes, with traces of an additional crater just northeast. Despite the presence of an ice cap, lava flows are recognizable in the summit area.

The lava flows at larger distances are older than the ones close to the vent. Pyroclastic flow deposits are also found, but they might originate from Ampato rather than Sabancaya.

Between 1986 and 2016 the mountain lost over three quarters of its ice cap, and the remaining ice field broke up into several ice bodies.

Indeed, a phase of ground uplift at Hualca Hualca volcano and earthquake swarms in 1990 and later seismic activity under Hualca Hualca could indicate that the magma chamber of Sabancaya is actually under the neighbouring volcano, a not uncommon phenomenon at volcanoes.

Geology 

The tectonic conditions in the region have not been constant over time; at various times the plates approached each other at higher speed, and this led to a compressional tectonic regimen. In the Western Cordillera however, tensional faulting facilitated the occurrence of voluminous volcanism. This faulting is still underway and produces earthquakes in the area.

The basement of the volcano is formed by Precambrian rocks, which are overlaid by various sediments and volcanic formations of Mesozoic and Cenozoic age. Especially during the Neogene, the supply of volcanic material was high and dominated the region, forming a volcanic "foot"; the present volcanoes are constructed on this volcanic "foot". This "foot" is made out of an ignimbrite plateau that drops down south. The "foot" beneath Ampato, Hualca Hualca and Sabancaya has been dated 2.2 ±0.15 million years ago, while a lava flow beneath the first and the last of these is about 0.8 ±0.04 million years old.

Composition 

Fresh volcanites of Sabancaya consist of porphyritic andesite and dacite which form a potassium-rich calc-alkaline suite similar to other volcanoes in southern Peru; the andesites occasionally appear as fine-grained enclaves. The rocks are not very vesicular and contain a moderate amount of phenocrysts. Minerals encountered in both phenocrysts and groundmass are amphibole, biotite, hornblende, iron oxide, plagioclase, pyroxene and titanium oxide; degraded olivine is also found.

Isotope data indicate that the pre-magmas interacted with the crust at great depths before rising to shallower magma chambers. In these shallower magma chambers, magma genesis involved processes of magma mixing which formed at least part of the andesites and fractional crystallization which gave rise to the dacites. Partial crystallization and flow events within the magma chamber caused the formation of the andesite enclaves.

The amount of water emitted by Sabancaya is noticeably large for a volcano (about ); the source of this water might be an evaporating hydrothermal system in the volcano.

Eruptive history 

Initially, Ampato volcano was the active volcano before volcanism shifted to Sabancaya, after a period where both volcanoes erupted. Presently, most activity at Sabancaya occurs in the form of lava domes and lava flows, one of which is dated to 5,440 ±40 years before present on the eastern flank. Additional surface exposure dating has yielded ages of 6,650 ±320 and 6,300 ±310 on various lava flows, indicating that effusive activity started shortly after the beginning of the Holocene although the basal part of the edifice did not exist yet at that time. Pyroclastic eruptions are less common and have a low volume, with one such occurrence dated to 8,500 years before present. This tephra layer, along with layers dated 2500-2100 BC, 420–150 BC, 100 BC – 150 AD and between 1200 and 1400 AD, could have originated either on Sabancaya or Ampato, however. There is evidence that early and middle-Holocene Sabancaya mostly erupted lava, while the late-Holocene volcano was more explosive in its activity. It is possible that the Inca performed human sacrifices in response to eruptions of Sabancaya to calm down the mountain spirits.

Spanish chronicles mention probable eruptions in 1752 and 1784, which might have left layers of tephra. After the 18th century, the volcano went dormant for about two hundred years during which only fumarolic activity was recorded. In late 1986 an increased fumarolic activity heralded the onset of a new eruptive period, and satellite images observed the occurrence of black spots where the ice had melted or boiled away. During this time, the death of animals was observed in the area. This period reached a climax in May 1990, when an eruption with a volcanic explosivity index of 2–3 occurred. The eruption and further activity, through 1990, enlarged the summit crater and caused the formation of new rows of fumaroles. Chemical analysis, of the volcanic rocks, suggests that this phase of volcanic activity was started by the injection of mafic magma into the magma chamber. This eruption displaced between 4,000 and 1,500 people in the region.

Ash fall from these eruptions induced melting of the glaciers on Ampato, in 1995 exposing the Mummy Juanita on the latter volcano.

In March and April 2013, fumarolic activity and the occurrence of seismic swarms increased leading to local infrastructure being damaged; an eruption occurred in August 2014. Ash was emitted by the volcano multiple times through 2014 and 2015, and there has been steady shallow seismic activity since 2013.

A further increase of fumarolic activity was observed in 2016, when new fumaroles appeared and sulfur flux increased to  sulfur dioxide. This renewed activity was accompanied by ground uplift at Hualca Hualca north of Sabancaya, indicating the role of a shared magmatic system between the two volcanoes. A persistent gas plume lies above the volcano and repeated emissions of ash have happened, resulting in several alerts for the local population. Lahars have been produced in some occasions, without reports of damage. A lava dome began to grow in 2017 within the crater, with unsteady explosive activity and occasional seismic swarms. In 2020, a second lava dome formed in November but it was destroyed between December and February of that year. Ash emissions and seismic activity continued through 2021 and 2022.

Hazards 

Sabancaya rises above the valleys of the Colca river and of some tributaries of the Siguas river with about 35,000 people living in them. About 30,000 people live within  from the volcano. In the case of a major Plinian eruption, at least 60,000 to 70,000 people would be threatened. Rock fall would affect the area close to the summit domes, as would pyroclastic flows; these would be a further hazard to the valleys draining the volcano.

The presence of an ice cap is an additional source of danger, as its melting during a volcanic eruption could form hazardous lahars, although the small volume of the ice cap limits their damage potential. The Majes River and Sihuasi River drainages would be threatened by such mudflows in case of an eruption; the former is the site of a major irrigation project. Other dangers from eruptions at Sabancaya are tephra fallout, which can impact the health of people; and lava flows, which however are not much of a threat to humans owing to their slow speed.

Volcano monitoring in Peru commenced after the 1986 eruption, with the  being created two years later and beginning its work at Sabancaya. The monitoring network around the volcano was expanded after its 2013 eruption. The  monitors Sabancaya with infrasound detectors, seismometers, surveillance cameras, telemetry units and also uses data from satellites and volcanic ash collectors; it has published a hazard map. In 2005, monitoring commenced of the gas emissions from Sabancaya. Aside from the direct threat of eruptions, Sabancaya also contributes to  air pollution in the Colca valley, which can damage plants and cause respiratory distress in animals and humans. Ash clouds from Sabancaya frequently impede air travel over the region; the volcano is one of the most frequent causes of volcanic ash-related air traffic advisories in the world.

See also

 List of volcanoes in Peru
 Lake Mucurca

References

Sources

 
 
 
 
 
 
 
 
 
 
 
 
 
 
 

Stratovolcanoes of Peru
Mountains of Arequipa Region
Active volcanoes
Andean Volcanic Belt
Subduction volcanoes
Five-thousanders of the Andes